William Connor Donovan III (born February 10, 1992) is an American professional basketball coach. He is the son of Billy Donovan, the head coach of the National Basketball Association's Chicago Bulls. Donovan is listed as a guest coach for the San Antonio Spurs 2019 NBA Summer League in Las Vegas.

College career
William Donovan III, began his college at Catholic University of America in Washington, D.C. As a sophomore the Catholic University Cardinals played an exhibition game against the Florida Gators.

He transferred to Florida from Catholic University and walked on to his father's team as a reserve guard.

Coaching career
On November 6, 2014, his father, Billy Donovan, said that Donovan would pursue a career in coaching.  On March 23, 2016, he was named head coach for the Saint Francis High School basketball team

Personal life
His mother, Christine Hasbrouck (nee D'Auria) Donovan, graduated from Providence College in 1986 and married William's father on August 5, 1989. He has three siblings: Connor, Hasbrouck Anne and Bryan Donovan. A sister, Jacqueline Patricia, was stillborn at birth on November 2, 2000. His mother is a descendant of the Hasbrouck family of Ulster County, New York. He is also a descendant of Louis DuBois.

References

External links
Catholic University Cardinals bio

Living people
Austin Spurs coaches
American men's basketball coaches
American men's basketball players
Basketball coaches from Florida
Basketball players from Florida
Catholic University Cardinals men's basketball players
Florida Gators men's basketball players
High school basketball coaches in Florida
Point guards
Basketball players from Lexington, Kentucky
Sportspeople from Lexington, Kentucky
1992 births